The Târnava (full name in ; ;) is a river in Romania. It is formed by the confluence of the Târnava Mare and Târnava Mică in the town of Blaj. The Târnava flows into the Mureș after 23 km near the town of Teiuș. The two source rivers of the Târnava are the Târnava Mare and Târnava Mică, and its tributaries include the Tur, Izvorul Iezerului, Secaș, and the Dunărița.

Etymology 

The name Târnava is of Slavic origin from trn, meaning "thorn".

Other proposed origins for the river's Romanian name is Turn (tower) + dav from Dacian dava (structure/fortress), i.e. "the river that flows amongst towers and davas"; or a reference to the Romanian city of Turda, forming  Tur + ava from dava.

Trn (thorn) is used by Slavic peoples in the Balkans, but the 60% R1a Slavs (Poles, Belarusians, Russians) say syp/ship.

The Hungarian name Küküllő is of Old Turkic origin from kukel meaning sloe, and is thought to have originated from the Avar people.

References 

 
Rivers of Alba County
Place names of Slavic origin in Romania
Rivers of Romania